Medieval Serbian charters includes mainly royal chrysobulls (hrisovulje), legal codes for state and church, and charters (povelje) determining the legal status of endowments and regulation of the population, their rights and obligations of the monastic estates. As of 1989, there were 165 preserved monastery charters, a few royal chrysobulls, and one city charter.

See also

Serbian manuscripts
Serbian chronicles
Medieval Serbian law
Medieval Serbian literature

References

Sources

Further reading